I-Empire is the second studio album by alternative rock band Angels & Airwaves. It was officially released worldwide on November 1, 2007 from the Angels & Airwaves website, where it was available for download. It was then released on CD on November 5 in the United Kingdom and Ireland, and on November 6 in the United States and Canada. It is their first album to feature Matt Wachter on bass.

Production
Angels & Airwaves started work on I-Empire in the beginning of 2007. It was the first album ever recorded at Jupiter Sound (Macbeth's studio).

On May 20, 2007, in an interview with Alternative Radio, the band said that the album was 60-70% complete and that the record would be out in October or November 2007. DeLonge also stated that the album would continue the element of the first album, but "times ten" and that in a story, I-Empire would follow We Don't Need to Whisper; We Don't Need to Whisper being a "re-birth" of life, and I-Empire being an album about what you do after the rebirth. It has a slightly more mellow, ambient tone with lyrics focusing more on relationships and less about war and conflict.

On May 30, 2007, DeLonge stated in an interview with Kerrang! that the new album would be named I-Empire and "this is as exciting as rock 'n' roll gets!"

On July 29, 2007, as a part of the 'Everybody Hurts' tour, Angels & Airwaves played the studio versions of four new songs from I-Empire to their fans. The songs played were "Secret Crowds", "Sirens", "Lifeline", and "Everything's Magic", along with live acoustic performances of "Everything's Magic", "The Gift", "Good Day", "Do It for Me Now", and "The Adventure". These songs were all recorded and leaked onto the internet, giving fans their first glimpse of I-Empire, along with the acoustic set.

Release and promotion

Original release
On September 10, 2007, the group revealed the album's artwork. "Everything's Magic" was made available for streaming via the group's Myspace account on August 29, 2007, and was released to radio on September 18. A music video was released for "Everything's Magic" on September 20. The album was delayed multiple times before its official release. DeLonge originally stated that I-Empire would be released on October 16. The release date was later pushed back to October 23. The following day, I-Empire was fully leaked onto the internet, a week before its worldwide release. That same day DeLonge posted his response to the leak on the Angels & Airwaves MySpace. The album was eventually released on November 6 through Geffen and Suretone Records. On November 16, DeLonge announced on Modlife that the band were making a short film for the song "Breathe". The short film for the song was made shortly after, and was later released exclusively to premium Modlife members.

From late January to mid-March 2008, the band embarked on their headlining North American tour, playing sold-out theaters with Meg and Dia, Ace Enders and The Color Fred. "Secret Crowds" was chosen as the second single from I-Empire, although "Call to Arms" was also considered, after receiving lots of positive feedback and decent digital sales. The song impacted radio on February 5. On February 25, "Secret Crowds" aired on MTV2, being the band's second single from the album to hit commercial heights with a music video. It has since gone onto Kerrang! TV and Scuzz in the UK. "Breathe" is the third single taken from the album, and the video was released on June 20, 2008.

Vinyl release

In January 2016, DeLonge's media company, To the Stars, announced the release of a 180 gram clear first pressing of I-Empire, available only to paid members of the company's website. The vinyl edition features bonus acoustic tracks, "The Adventure" and "Good Day". The record was produced on vinyl by SRC Vinyl and Stan Ricker Mastering. In early February 2016, SRC Vinyl announced a 180 gram gold-colored second pressing of the record, available exclusively on the SRC Vinyl website to the public.

On January 11, 2017, DeLonge and To the Stars announced via social media and the To the Stars official website that the entire Angels & Airwaves discography, including a re-pressing of I-Empire, would be released in a new vinyl collection collectively called Angels & Airwaves 2017 Hope vinyl collection. The website also made all of the band's albums and EPs available individually. The collection was released exclusively through the To the Stars website and became available for pre-order on January 11, 2017 before being released on February 15, 2017. The re-pressing of I-Empire as well as the other albums in the collection are 180 gram transparent LPs each with their own individual o-card slipcase that feature a double-sided die cut "AVA" logo.

Reception

Critical reception

I-Empire garnered generally mixed reviews from music critics. At Metacritic, which assigns a normalized rating out of 100 to reviews from mainstream critics, the album received an average of 54, based on 13 reviews.

Evan Sawdey from PopMatters said that despite the lyricism of the tracks feeling generic, he praised DeLonge for creating "grandiose pop-rock with a healthy dash of New Wave" that's far away from the aesthetics of his project's debut effort. He concluded that, "Where Whisper came off like an ego-driven side project, I-Empire paints the Angels as a fully-fledged band. Give them time: you may even forget that this was the guy who wrote "All the Small Things" to begin with."
Aubin Paul of Punknews.org praised the scaling back of length throughout the track listing that allowed for immediacy in its hooks and melodies, saying that it makes for "a better album, and Angels & Airwaves [is] a better band." AllMusic's Stephen Thomas Erlewine called it "an easier record to like than We Don't Need to Whisper," commending DeLonge for giving his tracks more catchy hooks and immediate attention to the listeners but felt he was in a musical growing phase when crafting more mature content, concluding that "it marks a very small, very tentative progression toward [DeLonge] realizing that he can expand his sonic and emotional horizons without abandoning the pop songcraft that remains his greatest strength." Scott Evil of NME said of the album as a whole: "Angels & Airwaves labour under the illusion that ‘mature’ equals ‘worthwhile’; and that means long, directionless songs swathed in echo pedals and factory-set keyboards."

Commercial performance
The album debuted at number 9 on the US Billboard 200 chart, with just over 66,000 copies sold in its first week.

Track listing

Personnel
Adapted credits from the liner notes of I-Empire.

Angels & Airwaves
Tom DeLonge – lead vocals, rhythm guitar, keyboards
David Kennedy – lead guitar, keyboards, synthesizers
Matt Wachter  – bass guitar, synthesizers, backing vocals
Atom Willard – drums, percussion

Artwork
Drew Struzan – album cover
Joshua Ortega – front cover design
Brendan Raasch – album design, layout
Miranda Penn – band photos

Production
Tom DeLonge – producer
Jeff 'Critter' Newell – co-producer, engineer, sonic manipulation, percussion, band photos
Roger Joseph Manning Jr. – keyboards
Tom Lord-Alge – mixer
Brian Gardner – mastering
Doug Reesh – guitar and bass technician

Charts

Album

Singles

Release history

References

External links

 I-Empire at YouTube (streamed copy where licensed)
 I-Empire on Geffen Records

2007 albums
Concept albums
Angels & Airwaves albums
Geffen Records albums
Albums produced by Tom DeLonge
Albums with cover art by Drew Struzan